Hot Rod Circuit (HRC) is an American emo band from Auburn, Alabama, established in 1997.

History

Early years
The band was originally known as Antidote under which they released the album Mr. Glenboski, which won the group the award of Best Unsigned Band of 1998 by Musician Magazine.  The band subsequently moved to Connecticut and released If I Knew Now What I Knew Then under their present moniker.

Hot Rod Circuit's first record, "If I Knew Now What I Knew Then" was released  on September 21, 1999. The Band was composed of Andy Jackson on Vocals and Rhythm Guitar, Casey Prestwood on Lead Guitar, Jason Russell on Bass and Vocals, and Wes Cross on drums. The disc featured songs such as "Weak Warm," "Remover," and "Irish Car Bomb." The band had done several shows that year in the New England area, along with tours with The Get Up Kids, At the Drive-In and Jazz June. The band's drummer Wes Cross left the band before their next release.

The next album released by HRC hit record stores in September 2000; it was entitled "If It's Cool With You, It's Cool With Me." The record included songs such as "The Power of the Vitamins," "This is Not the Time or Place," and "Flight 89." The record also featured the band's first taste of radio airplay when their single "Radio Song" came in at number two on the college radio charts. In addition drummer Michael Poorman became Wes Cross's replacement. In support of the release, Hot Rod Circuit did national tours with bands such as Jimmy Eat World and Reggie and the Full Effect, and eventually an acoustic tour with The New Amsterdams, known as "The Hot Amsterdams Tour."

Sorry About Tomorrow
During 2001, Hot Rod Circuit was receiving several offers from different record labels such as Drive-Thru and MCA, that were eager for the band to sign. By the fall of 2001, they had signed with Vagrant Records. The band's third record, "Sorry About Tomorrow" was released on March 12, 2002. The record included the band's more popular tracks like, "The Pharmacist," "At Nature's Mercy" and "Safely." The album was recorded at Salad Days Studio in Maryland. Frontman Andy Jackson stated, "The record has a feel-good summertime vibe to it." During 2002, HRC played over 250 shows supporting national artists such as, Dashboard Confessional, Saves The Day, New Found Glory, Good Charlotte, Less Than Jake, MxPx, and More. HRC played the first Vagrant America Tour. With the record, came a music video for the single, "The Pharmacist." The video aired on MTV and MTV2 nationwide. In 2003, the band toured England for a period of time where they played The Reading Leeds Festival. "Sorry About Tomorrow" was Hot Rod Circuit's highest selling record released. During 2002, Triple Crown Records released a B-Sides entitled "Been There, Smoked That." The disc was composed of songs from HRC's original out-of-print EP. It also featured live songs and commentaries from "The Hot Amstradams Tour" in 2001 and a few covers by ACDC and FUDGE. In late 2003, shortly after their tour in England, drummer Mike Poorman left the band to pursue his engineering efforts.

Reality's Coming Through
During the early winter of 2004, Hot Rod Circuit hit the studio with producer Tim O' Hier to record their newest efforts. In August 2004, Hot Rod released "Reality's Coming Through," their second for Vagrant Records. This record over all, proved to be less successful as "Sorry About Tomorrow." "Reality's Coming Through" had a darker feel to it, and strayed far from the rough, stripped-down vibe of "Sorry About Tomorrow." The record featured songs like "Inhabit" and "The Best You Ever Knew." With the record came new drummer Dan Duggins. The band also added Brian Kiss on back up guitar and vocals. The band, now a five-piece, shot a music video for their new single, "Save You." The video appeared on MTV, FUSE, and MTV2. During 2004 and 2005, the band toured with bands like Say Anything, Brand New, Eisley, and more.

In spring of 2005, bass player and original member Jason Russell left the band to pursue his own band, Diamond J and The Rough. Russell played his last show unplugged with Andy Jackson at Cafe Nine in New Haven, CT. As a result, Hot Rod Circuit had to drop out of The Get Up Kids farewell tour. Hot Rod Circuit ventured out on the 2005 Warped Tour, when Hero Pattern bassist Rob Fitzgerald filled in. Soon after Warped, Brian Kiss exited the band, resulting in many fill-ins throughout the rest of the year. Hot Rod Circuit set out on a late summer and fall tour with Hit The Lights, Straylight Run, and Piebald, where many different musicians were included in Hot Rod's live line up. Jake and Jeff Turner of Say Anything filled in on bass and guitar for several of these dates. Jerry Morrison of Bleach, and Joe Ballaro played bass for several other dates.

Hiatus
After the Hit The Lights tour of 2005, Hot Rod Circuit began what was over a year long break. In early 2006, the band played a few college shows, but did not tour for an entire year. Hot Rod Circuit had announced plans to record and release a record in 2006, but no music was released other than a few demos. Rumors began circulating of their relationship with Vagrant Records, who had removed them from their online roster. The band gave no information or comment on this, and did not report any set plans for a new record. Finally, around Thanksgiving of 2006, Hot Rod announced their departure from Vagrant Records. The band stated that they had signed with independent music label, Immortal Records. Joe Ballaro was now a permanent fixture to the band as their new bass player.

Andy Jackson released this statement: "Our contract was up with Vagrant. Vagrant's format changed a lot since we've been there, especially since Sorry About Tomorrow came out. They just added a whole lot of different bands and we pretty much became lost in the shuffle. The commodity bands were getting the attention we felt we deserved. With Immortal they contacted us, asked if we wanted to sign, and we told them: 'look, we want to sign with a label that'll let us make our own record.' They were hip with it and down with our demos and stuff like that. It was kind of a no-brainer on our part to have a label that's going to support and be into what we're doing."

The Underground is a Dying Breed
In spring of 2007, after signing with Immortal Records, Hot Rod Circuit released The Underground is a Dying Breed. Andy Jackson stated, "There are parts of the CD that are going to make people say 'wow.' We recorded 16 songs and we haven't decided on which 11 are going to make the CD at this point, it's kind of up in the air. There are definitely your typical Hot Rod Circuit rockers and then there are like this kind of like Country songs we're really toying with. All the songs will come out. I don't know if they'll be on the CD, but they'll be out in some fashion."

The record was recorded and produced by Andy Jackson at his studio in Montgomery, Alabama. With the release of a new record, came a full US/Canada tour with The Forecast & Limbeck.

HRC shot a video for the single, "Stateside" starring actress Eva Hamilton. The video was the winner of FUSE's "Oven Fresh".

Breakup
On October 8, 2007, Hot Rod Circuit announced that they would be parting ways after ten years together. The band made this statement on Myspace, "Yes it is true this will be the last Hot Rod Circuit tour.
Thank you so much for coming to shows and buying our records for the past ten years. It has been a blast and we have made so many friends and fans and we will miss you all. Stay tuned for more info on what everyone from hrc is up to. I will be sure to keep you posted. Oh and thanks to everyone over in Australia for showing us a good time. Thank you so much Andy, Hot Rod Circuit
Please pass this along and come enjoy the farewell tour..." Hot Rod Circuit went on to play a small eight date east coast farewell tour. Hot Rod Circuit played their last show to a sold out crowd at Toad's Place in New Haven, CT.

Reunion
On February 10, 2011, it was confirmed that Hot Rod Circuit will be reuniting for a one-off performance at the Krazy Fest 2011 in Louisville, Kentucky, with future plans uncertain. Following Jackson's departure from his other band Terrible Things on April 20, 2011, speculation raised that the band's reunion might be full-time, with more shows to follow Krazy Fest. On September 1, 2011, it was announced that Hot Rod Circuit would embark on a short 8 date tour of the US in November, and will also release a new limited edition 7" vinyl EP with three songs - two originals entitled "Forgive Me" and "Into the Sun" and a cover of Superdrag's "Sucked Out".

Post Break Up
Andy Jackson announced his new side project, Death in the Park in early 2008. Hot Rod Circuit bassist, Joe Ballaro played in the band and later went on to play with The Queen Killing Kings.

In February 2008, Hot Rod Circuit posted a bulletin on Myspace stating that they were working on a B-Sides Record that would feature unreleased material from previous records, and would also include a live DVD of their last show. It has not yet been released.

Death in the Park played a few tours and shows with bands such as Paramore, Saosin, Underoath, The Forecast, Saves The Day, and Alkaline Trio. The band released a five track EP in the fall of 2008. The band announced plans to release their full-length album in the spring of 2009. The self-titled record was digitally released through Austin indie label End Sounds on August 24, 2010, with a physical release following on September 14.

Andy Jackson played acoustic Hot Rod sets after Death in the Park on localized dates. The string of shows was limited to the New England Area. In summer of 2009, Andy Jackson played a few acoustic HRC sets with Anthony Raneri of Bayside. These dates were localized to Florida. Then in the fall of 2009, Jackson played HRC sets for New England once again.

In 2007, Casey Prestwood released his first solo record, The Hurtin' Kind.  Since his solo debut, Casey, along with his band The Burning Angels, have released four more albums.  His 5th and newest album, "Born Too Late" is set for release in early 2017.

In late 2009, Andy Jackson announced his new project, Terrible Things. He formed the band with Fred Mascherino and Josh Eppard. In early 2010 the band signed with Universal/Motown. The band is slated to do dates on Warped Tour 2010 and released their full-length debut on August 31, 2010.

In 2014, Andy Jackson's new project Sloss Minor signed with JMB Records and April 20, 2014 they released the album "G Major Unit Zero."

Second Reunion and Future
On December 11, 2014, Andy Jackson announced via Twitter the current line-up of Andy, Casey, Jay, and Mike. Prior to this announcement, Jackson had posted a song clip of a new Hot Rod Circuit song via his Instagram.
In 2019, Hot Rod Circuit announced they would join Saves The Day on their “Through Being Cool” tour and would play “Sorry About Tomorrow” in its entirety.

Band members
Current line-up
 Andy Jackson (vocals, rhythm guitar)
 Casey Prestwood (guitar, pedal steel)
 Jason Russell (bass, vocals)
 Mike Poorman(drums)

Former members
 Wes Cross (1996-1999)
 Dustin Hudson (1997-1999)
 Dan Duggins (2006-2007)
 Brian Kiss (2004–2005)
 Jake Turner (Fill In - 2005)
 Jeff Turner (Fill In - 2005)
 Jerry Morrison (Fill In - 2005)
 Rob Fitzgerald (Fill In - 2005)

Discography

Albums
 Mr. Glenboski - (1998 - New World Records)
 If I Knew Now What I Knew Then (1999 - Triple Crown Records)
 If It's Cool With You, It's Cool With Me (2000 - Triple Crown Records)
 Sorry About Tomorrow (2002 - Vagrant Records)
 Reality's Coming Through (2004 - Vagrant Records)
 The Underground Is A Dying Breed (2007 - Immortal Records)

EPs & Singles
 Hot Rod Circuit - 1999
 Split w/ The Anniversary - 2000
 Split w/ thisyearsmodel - 2001
 Pharmacist - 2003
 The Underground Is A Dying Breed (iTunes Acoustic EP) - 2007
 Hot Rod Circuit - 2011
 Default Setting - 2017

Compilations & Soundtracks
 Revelation-A-Pop-A-Lypse - 1999
 I ♥ Metal - 1999
 Y2K Proof - 2000
 Welcome To Triple Crown - 2000
 The Best Comp In The World - 2000
 Another Year On The Streets Volume 2 - 2001
 Been There, Smoked That - 2003
 Atticus ...Dragging The Lake II - 2003
 Beer: The Movie - 2003
 Last Nights Escape - 2003
 Outlaw Volleyball: Music From The Game - 2003
 Another Year On The Streets Vol. 3 - 2004
 A Santa Cause 2: Its A Punk Rock Christmas - 2006
 Yo! Indie Rock Raps (Warped Tour Edition) - 2007
 Punk Goes Crunk - 2008
 Friends - 2014

Notes and references

External links
 Official site
 Dan Duggins personal drumming site
 Profile on MySpace

American emo musical groups
Musical groups established in 1997
Musical groups disestablished in 2007
Triple Crown Records artists
Run for Cover Records artists
Rock music groups from Alabama